The Battery "A" 1st Michigan Light Artillery Regiment, also known as the "Loomis' Battery" or the "Coldwater Artillery," was an artillery battery that served in the Union Army during the American Civil War.

Service
Battery "A"  was a pre-war militia unit that tendered an offer of service and was enlisted as a body on April 23, 1861, and re-mustered in for three years' service on May 28, 1861.

The battery was mustered out on July 12, 1865.

Total strength and casualties
The battery suffered 1 officer and 11 enlisted men who were killed in action or mortally wounded and 28 enlisted men who died of disease, for a total of 40
fatalities.

Commanders
 Captain Cyrus O. Loomis
 Captain Francis E. Hale

See also
List of Michigan Civil War Units
Michigan in the American Civil War

Notes

References
The Civil War Archive

External links
https://web.archive.org/web/20110716084401/http://www.civilwaralbum.com/misc/perry1.htm
https://web.archive.org/web/20070623064152/http://www.bgsu.edu/colleges/library/cac/transcripts/ms0623t6202.html

https://web.archive.org/web/20070927213348/http://www.battleofperryville.com/battle.html
https://web.archive.org/web/20080509124009/http://www.fsu.edu/~ewoodwar/wvlee.html
http://www.suvcwmi.org/memorials/mcwm1.html
https://web.archive.org/web/20060325015622/http://www.michmarkers.com/startup.asp?startpage=S0555.htm
http://www.nwtskirmisher.org/loomis.shtml
http://www.aotc.net/Perryville.htm
http://freepages.history.rootsweb.com/~indiana42nd/42nd_History_Perryville.htm
https://web.archive.org/web/20071012152015/http://michiganhistorymagazine.com/date/october03/10_08_1862.html

Artillery
1865 disestablishments in Michigan
Artillery units and formations of the American Civil War
1861 establishments in Michigan
Military units and formations established in 1861
Military units and formations disestablished in 1865